Yana Toom (born Jana Tšernogorova, formerly Yana Litvinova; 15 October 1966) is an Estonian politician who has been serving as a Member of the European Parliament since 2014. She is a member of the Estonian Centre Party.

Born to ethnic Russian immigrant parents, Toom become a naturalized citizen of Estonia in 2008. In the 2015 Estonian elections, Toom was also elected to the Estonian parliament (Riigikogu) with 11,573 votes; she decided to not become MP and kept her MEP seat in the European Parliament instead.

A member of the ALDE (Group of the Alliance of Liberals and Democrats for Europe), Toom currently serves on the Committee on Petitions (since 2014) and the Committee on Regional Development (since 2021). She was previously a member of the Committee on Employment and Social Affairs (2014–2021) and her parliamentary group's coordinator on the Committee on Culture and Education (2014–2019).

In addition to her committee assignments, Toom has been part of the parliament's delegation to the EU-Russia Parliamentary Cooperation Committee since 2014. She is also a member of the European Parliament Intergroup on Artificial Intelligence and Digital, the European Parliament Intergroup on Extreme Poverty and Human Rights and the European Parliament Intergroup on Traditional Minorities, National Communities and Languages.

Toom was re-elected in 2019.

In the 2023 Estonian parliamentary election, she was elected in the Riigikogu electoral district no. 7.

Controversy
In July 2016, Toom was part of a small delegation of MEPs, including Javier Couso Permuy and Tatjana Ždanoka, which traveled to Damascus to meet Bashar Al-Assad.

References

1966 births
21st-century Estonian politicians
21st-century Estonian women politicians
Estonian Centre Party MEPs
Estonian people of Russian descent
Living people
Members of the Riigikogu, 2011–2015
Members of the Riigikogu, 2023–2027
MEPs for Estonia 2014–2019
MEPs for Estonia 2019–2024
Politicians from Tallinn
University of Tartu alumni
Women MEPs for Estonia